Class of '61 is a 1993 American war  drama television film produced by Steven Spielberg as a projected television series about the American Civil War. It focused on men who were classmates at West Point and separated by the war between the North and the South. Filmed in Charleston, South Carolina and Atlanta, this work was the first collaboration between Spielberg and cinematographer Janusz Kamiński.

Plot
The film follows the lives of several West Point classmates who fight on opposite sides of the American Civil War, which disrupts their previously close community.

The film also follows the adventures of Lucius, a slave who escapes via the underground railroad to freedom. The film cuts between the First Battle of Bull Run and the birth of Lucius' child into slavery.

Cast
 Dan Futterman as Shelby Peyton
 Josh Lucas as George Armstrong Custer
 John P. Navin, Jr. as Burnett
 Clive Owen as Devin O'Neil
 Sophie Ward as Shannen O'Neil
 Laura Linney as Lily Magraw
 Andre Braugher as Lucius
 Barry Cullison as Sergeant Yancy
 Len Cariou as Dr Leland Peyton
 Dana Ivey as Mrs Julia Peyton
 Robert Newman as Capt. Wykoff

Production
Renowned Civil War historian Shelby Foote acted as consultant, and documentary producer Ken Burns was acknowledged for his contributions. He had created the critically acclaimed The Civil War documentary series in 1990.

References

External links
 

1993 television films
1993 films
1990s action drama films
1990s biographical drama films
1990s historical films
1990s war drama films
Action films based on actual events
Action television films
American Civil War films
Drama films based on actual events
American drama television films
Films scored by John Debney
Films about American slavery
Films about death
Films about dysfunctional families
Films about friendship
Films about religion
Films directed by Gregory Hoblit
Films set in 1861
American war drama films
War films based on actual events
War television films
Cultural depictions of George Armstrong Custer
1990s English-language films
1990s American films